People Who Travel may refer to:

 People Who Travel (1938 French-language film), a French-German film
 People Who Travel (1938 German-language film), a German drama film